The Monash University Law Review is a scholarly refereed law journal based at the Monash University Faculty of Law. The journal is managed by an editorial committee of Monash University students who are assisted by two faculty advisors. The editors for 2023 are Justin Fei, Arieh Herszberg, Isabelle Lim and Clement Wong.

Editorial alumni
Editorial alumni of the Monash University Law Review include judges of the Federal Court of Australia and the Supreme Court of Victoria, including the current Chief Justice of Victoria, as well as prominent academics, barristers, and legal practitioners.
 
Past editors have been:
 2022: Esther Khor, David Lim, Thomas Mason, Rhys Moreno and Arman Riazati
 2021: Georgie Bian, Habiba Hussain, Brayden Poon and Catherine Zhou
 2020: Tamara Ernest, Vanessa Filipendin, Isaac Johanson-Blok, Lisa Mearns and Omer Samuni
 2019: Yueh-Shin Chen, Jacob Flynn, Lynette Ji, Carla Massaria and Luke Rycken
 2018: Andrew Belyea-Tate, Nicola Bird, Dafni Samuni and Roger Wu
 2017: Neal Chandru, Andrew Chong, Siobhan Lane, and Freeman Zhong
 2016: Zoe-Alexandra Chapman, Anthony Di Gregorio, Evan Ritli, Ailsa Wallace
 2015: Jude Hunter, Elysia Longo, Benjamin Nelson, and Katya Udorovic
 2014: Alice Godfree, Helena Kanton, Jakub Patela, and Calum Sargeant
 2013: Melissa Kennedy, Brooke Smith, and Duncan Wallace
 2012: Israel Cowen, Scott Joblin, and Jasmine Kahan
 2011: Irene Argeres, Andrew Roe, and Drossos Stamboulakis
 2010: Natalia Antolak-Saper, Seona March, and Eleanor Mulholland
 2009: Marianna Parry, Eleni Stamboulakis, and Sylvester Urban
 2008: Merav Bloch, Cameron Miles, and Albert Ounapuu
 2007: Angel Aleksov and Tamar Somasundaram
 2006: Helen Conrad, Michael Dunstan, and Lachlan McMurtrie
 2005: Patrick Ky and Vidal Vanhoof
 2004: Jaclyn Grant and Helen Konstantopoulos
 2003: Vicki Donnenberg and Sandra Draganich
 2002: Jeremy Leibler and Ronli Sifris
 2001: Susan Dowling and Pauline Wilson
 2000: Patrick Lau, Premala Thiagarajan, and Ben Ross
 1999: Kathryn Bundrock and Michael Rush
 1998: Oren Bigos and Kay Wilson
 1997: Andrew Hanak and Debra Paver
 1996: Andrew Deszcz and Alistair Pound
 1995: Glenda Beecher and Marnie Hammond
 1994: Julienne Baron and Gregory Bosmans
 1993: Elizabeth Adam and Christina Warren
 1992: Sweet Ping Phang and Kellech Smith
 1991: Daniel Clough, Annemaree McDonough, Sweet Ping Phang, and Kellech Smith
 1990: Kate Barrett, David Kreltszheim, Daniel Clough, and Annemaree McDonough
 1989: Jonathan Clough, Jennifer Douglas, Hoong Phun Lee, Marilyn Pittard, Kate Barrett, and David Kreltszheim
 1988: Kathryn Rees, Natalina Velardi, Graham Thomson, and Eric Windholz
 1987: Sharon Arndell, Jennifer Nielsen, Kathryn Rees, and Natalina Velardi
 1986: Stuart Brown,  Debra Mortimer, Sharon Arndell, and Jennifer Nielsen
 1985: Janet Campbell, Susanne Liden, Stuart Brown, and Debra Mortimer
 1984: Janet Campbell and Susanne Liden
 1983: John Jarrett and Warwick Rothnie
 1982: Anne Ferguson, P Murphy, and Ben Potter
 1981: Mark Hayes, Wendy Peter, and Chris Spence
 1980: Robert Sandler and Brian Simpson
 1979: Arie Freiberg
 1978: Bob Baxt, C R Williams, B M Young, F A Trindade, and Arie Freiberg
 1977: Bob Baxt, Brett M Young, and Arie Freiberg
 1975–76: Bob Baxt and C R Williams
 1974–75: Bob Baxt

References

External links

Australian law journals